This article lists events that occurred during 1967 in Estonia.

Incumbents

Events
Gradual introduction of five-day workweek was finished (started in 1966).

Births

Deaths

References

 
1960s in Estonia
Estonia
Estonia
Years of the 20th century in Estonia